Fitchville Township is one of the nineteen townships of Huron County, Ohio, United States. As of the 2010 census the population of the township was 1,056.

Geography
Located in the eastern part of the county, it borders the following townships:
Hartland Township - north
Clarksfield Township - northeast corner
New London Township - east
Ruggles Township, Ashland County - southeast corner
Greenwich Township - south
Ripley Township - southwest corner
Fairfield Township - west
Bronson Township - northwest corner

No municipalities are located in Fitchville Township.

Name and history
Fitchville Township was established in 1828. The only Fitchville Township statewide, it is named for one Colonel Fitch, a landowner and native of Connecticut.

Government
The township is governed by a three-member board of trustees, who are elected in November of odd-numbered years to a four-year term beginning on the following January 1. Two are elected in the year after the presidential election and one is elected in the year before it. There is also an elected township fiscal officer, who serves a four-year term beginning on April 1 of the year after the election, which is held in November of the year before the presidential election. Vacancies in the fiscal officership or on the board of trustees are filled by the remaining trustees.

References

External links
County website

Townships in Huron County, Ohio
Townships in Ohio
Populated places established in 1828
1828 establishments in Ohio